Philippia is a genus of plant in family Ericaceae. Its species range from southern to tropical Africa, Madagascar, and the Mascarene Islands. Philippia is a characteristic Afromontane genus in southern and eastern Africa, found in montane forests and shrublands. The former genus name of Philippia was in honour of Rodolfo Amando (or Rudolph Amandus) Philippi (1808–1904), who was a German–Chilean paleontologist and zoologist. 

This is now listed as a synonym of Erica.

References 

Ericoideae
Ericaceae genera
Taxonomy articles created by Polbot